John Scudamore may refer to:

 John Scudamore (landowner), of the 15th century, MP
 John Scudamore (died 1571) (1503–1571), MP for Herefordshire, 1529
 Sir John Scudamore (courtier) (1542–1623), MP for Herefordshire, 1571 to 1593 and 1597 to 1601.
 John Scudamore, 1st Viscount Scudamore (1601–1671), diplomat and politician,
 John Scudamore, 2nd Viscount Scudamore, (1650-1697) British Member of Parliament for Herefordshire
 John Scudamore (1727–1796), British Member of Parliament for Hereford
 John Scudamore (1757–1805), British Member of Parliament for Hereford